Vontae Diggs (born November 7, 1995) is an American football linebacker for the New Orleans Breakers of the United States Football League (USFL). He played college football at Connecticut.

Personal life 
Vontae Diggs grew up in Downers Grove, Illinois and went to Downers Grove North High School.

College career 
Diggs played all 48 games for the UConn Huskies in his collegiate career. Diggs tallied 77 tackles and 3.5 tackles for loss in his senior season.

Professional career
He tried out with the Washington Redskins after graduating from the University of Connecticut. 

Diggs has played in five different football leagues, including the AAF and Arena Football League. Most notably, Diggs spent two years with the Edmonton Elks in the Canadian Football League where he won the team's "Most Outstanding Rookie" award in 2019. He was released by the Eskimos in 2020 and signed with the Toronto Argonauts. In October 2021 he was released by the Argonauts.

References

External links
 UConn Huskies bio

1995 births
Living people
Canadian football linebackers
UConn Huskies football players
Edmonton Elks players
Toronto Argonauts players
New Orleans Breakers (2022) players